Adolfo del Campo (born 28 October 1981, Bilbao, Spain) is a Spanish physicist and a professor of physics at the University of Luxembourg. He is best known for his work in quantum control and theoretical physics. He is notable as one of the co-pioneers of shortcuts to adiabaticity.

Academic career

Del Campo was educated at the University of the Basque Country,  The University of Texas at Austin, and The University of North Carolina at Chapel Hill. He completed his Ph.D. at the University of the Basque Country in 2008. He was a postdoctoral research associate at Imperial College London. He was awarded a Distinguished J. Robert Oppenheimer Fellowship at Los Alamos National Laboratory. In 2014, he became an associate professor at the University of Massachusetts. He was an Ikerbasque Research Professor at the Donostia International Physics Center (2019-2020) and is a full professor at the University of Luxembourg.
He has held visiting positions at several universities, including the National Autonomous University of Mexico, the University of Kyoto, Los Alamos National Laboratory, and Institut Henri Poincaré. 
During his career, del Campo has published over 100 peer-reviewed papers. 
He has contributed to developing shortcuts to adiabaticity, time in quantum mechanics, quantum speed limits, and the Kibble–Zurek mechanism.

Awards
 Distinguished J. R. Oppenheimer Fellow, Los Alamos National Laboratory - 2011
 Leon Heller PDPA Publication Award, Los Alamos National Laboratory - 2014

See also 
 Kibble-Zurek mechanism
 Shortcuts to adiabaticity
 Quantum speed limit

References

External links
 Official home page
 Editorial Board of Scientific Reports

Selected bibliography
Time in Quantum Mechanics - Vol. 2, Gonzalo Muga, Andreas Ruschhaupt, Adolfo del Campo (Eds.), (Springer LNP, 2011).
Assisted Finite-Rate Adiabatic Passage Across a Quantum Critical Point: Exact Solution for the Quantum Ising Model, Adolfo del Campo, Marek M. Rams, and Wojciech H. Zurek Phys. Rev. Lett. 109, 115703 (2012).
Shortcuts to adiabaticity by counterdiabatic driving, Adolfo del Campo, Phys. Rev. Lett. 111, 100502 (2013).
Quantum speed limits in open system dynamics, A. del Campo, I. L. Egusquiza, M. B. Plenio, and S. F. Huelga Phys. Rev. Lett. 110, 050403 (2013).
Causality and non-equilibrium second-order phase transitions in inhomogeneous systems, A. del Campo, T. W. B. Kibble, W. H. Zurek  J. Phys.: Condens. Matter 25, 404210 (2013) .
Universality of Phase Transition Dynamics: Topological Defects from Symmetry Breaking, Adolfo del Campo and Wojciech H. Zurek, Int. J. Mod. Phys. A 29, 1430018 (2014).
Quantum speed limits across the quantum-to-classical transition, B. Shanahan, A. Chenu, N. Margolus, and A. del Campo Phys. Rev. Lett. 120, 070401 (2018).
Universal Statistics of Topological Defects Formed in a Quantum Phase Transition , Adolfo del Campo Phys. Rev. Lett. 121, 200601 (2018).

1981 births
Living people
Quantum physicists
Theoretical physicists
Los Alamos National Laboratory personnel
University of Massachusetts faculty
Spanish physicists
People from Bilbao
Alumni of Imperial College London
University of Texas at Austin alumni
University of North Carolina at Chapel Hill alumni
University of the Basque Country alumni